Denis Constantin (born 29 July 1980) is a former Mauritian badminton player, and later represented Australia. He was the men's singles gold medallist at the 2000 African Championships, and in the men's doubles event partnered with Eddy Clarisse. He then defend the men's doubles gold in 2002 partnered with Stephan Beeharry. Constantin competed for Mauritius at the 1998, and 2002 Commonwealth Games, also at the 2000 Summer Olympics. He was awarded Athlete of the Month by the Mauritius Sports Council in June 2001. Constantin graduated from the La Trobe University in Melbourne, and now work as physiotherapists.

Achievements

African Championships 
Men's singles

Men's doubles

Mixed doubles

IBF International
Men's singles

Men's doubles

References

External links
 
 
 

1980 births
Living people
People from Plaines Wilhems District
Sportsmen from Queensland
Mauritian emigrants to Australia
Australian people of Mauritian descent
La Trobe University alumni
Australian physiotherapists
Australian male badminton players
Mauritian male badminton players
Olympic badminton players of Mauritius
Badminton players at the 2000 Summer Olympics
Commonwealth Games competitors for Mauritius
Badminton players at the 1998 Commonwealth Games
Badminton players at the 2002 Commonwealth Games